Diaphorobacter oryzae is a bacterium from the genus of Diaphorobacter which has been isolated from paddy soil from Cheongju in Korea.

References 

Comamonadaceae
Bacteria described in 2009